Gustaf Bonde may refer to:

 Gustaf Bonde (1620–1667), Lord High Treasurer of Sweden
 Gustaf Bonde (1682–1764), county governor, grandson of Gustaf Bonde (1620–1667)
 Gustaf Bonde (1698–1772), chamberlain, Lord of Sävstaholm
 Gustaf Bonde (1911–1977), Swedish diplomat and ambassador